Koupéla is a city in Burkina Faso, lying east of Ouagadougou and west of Fada-Ngourma in an area settled by the Mossi people.  It is known for its pottery and sculptures; these were made from natural clays found in the area. In 1900 Koupéla became the site of the first Catholic mission in Burkina Faso. Today it is the seat of an archdiocese, and contains a cathedral.

References

External link

 
Populated places in the Centre-Est Region